Koufonisi (Greek: Κουφονήσι, known as Leuce in antiquity) is an uninhabited Greek islet, located 5.6 km (3 nautical miles) south of cape Goudero on the coast of Lasithi, eastern Crete, in the Libyan Sea. It forms a close group of islands with Makroulo, Marmaro, Strongyli, and Trachilos.

History
Ancient ruins cover the island and can be dated from the Minoan civilisation and the post-Byzantine era when some of the caves were used as chapels during Christian persecution by the Ottomans. Due to the wealth of archaeology the island has been described as "a little Dilos".

Sponge fishing and purple dye
In ancient times Leuce was important for sponge fishing and for the production of a purple dye made from the gastropod Murex trunculus. The purple dye was a valuable commodity in ancient Greece and was worth its weight in solid silver.

Roman ruins
There are Roman ruins on the island including a theatre, that could seat 1,000 people, a temple, a villa with eight rooms, and a number of houses (probably the homes of fishermen). There are also remnants of the statue of a deity at the temple.

Greek War of Independence
In April 1823, 28 Cretan insurgents from the eastern part of Crete, under the chieftain Emmanouil Kozani, Emmanouil Alexi, and others boarded a small ship to go to Koufonisi at night where the notorious janissary Mehmet Pilavas and his 30 men were camped. The insurgents surrounded the janissaries and a gunfight ensued where Pilavas and 27 of his men were killed. Only three of the janissaries survived by hiding in crags in the rocks.

Lighthouse bombed during World War II
There are also the remains of a lighthouse that was bombed by the Germans during the Second World War.

Important Bird Area
Koufonisi and its adjacent islets have been designated an Important Bird Area (IBA) by BirdLife International because they support a population of Eleonora's falcons.

See also
List of islands of Greece

References

Islands of Greece
Mediterranean islands
Landforms of Lasithi
Tourist attractions in Crete
Former populated places in Greece
Archaeological sites in Greece
Uninhabited islands of Crete
Crete in World War II
Greek War of Independence
Roman sites in Greece
Important Bird Areas of Crete